Desert Car Kings is a show on Discovery Channel.

Episode list

References

External links 
 

Lists of American non-fiction television series episodes